Apostolos Drakopoulos (born 11 December 1966) is a retired Greek football striker.

References

1966 births
Living people
Greek footballers
Panachaiki F.C. players
Olympiacos F.C. players
Olympiakos Nicosia players
Athlitiki Enosi Larissa F.C. players
Olympiacos Volos F.C. players
Panegialios F.C. players
Association football forwards
Greek expatriate footballers
Expatriate footballers in Cyprus
Greek expatriate sportspeople in Cyprus